Andrija Kujundžić (29 November 1899 – 11 October 1970) was a Croatian footballer. He played in two matches for the Yugoslavia national football team in 1921 and 1922.

References

External links
 

1899 births
1970 deaths
Sportspeople from Subotica
Croats of Vojvodina
Association football defenders
Yugoslav footballers
Yugoslavia international footballers
FK Bačka 1901 players
Yugoslav football managers
FK Bačka 1901 managers